Conifer Grove is an upper-middle class suburb of Auckland, in northern New Zealand. Located on the eastern shores of the Pahurehure Inlet, on the Manukau Harbour, under authority of the Auckland Council. The suburb makes up the western side of the Takanini urban area and is in the Manurewa-Papakura ward of Auckland City. The suburb is known for its tree-lined streets, bay views, and until 2018 its border with the Manukau Golf Course. It includes the recent Waiata Shores subdivision developed by Fletcher Living.

History

Conifer Grove was constructed around 1965-1970. Conifer Grove's modern area (including Keywella Drive, Aristoy Close and Chippewa Place) was previously a dairy farm owned by the Strevens family, which connected onto Great South Road and is now the Waiata Shores subdivision (previously Manukau Golf Course). The names Walter Strevens Drive and Walter Strevens reserve come from the name of the patriarch of that family at the time it was sold - Walter John Strevens. 

In 2017 the previous Manukau Golf Course was bought by Fletcher Living to allow construction of a new housing development named Waiata Shores.

Fraser Thomas were commissioned to design the subdivision and to manage its construction. Fraser Thomas were awarded Certificates of Merit by both the Association of Consulting Engineers NZ and the New Zealand Institute of Surveyors.

During the major reformation of local government in 1989, Conifer Grove was re-zoned and the area was included into the Papakura District boundaries.

From October 2010, after a review of the Royal Commission on Auckland Governance, the entire Auckland Region was amalgamated into a single city authority. As well as the current Papakura District, other territorial authorities have been abolished and the entire area has been dissolved into a single Auckland city council. The suburb of Conifer Grove is now in the Manurewa-Papakura Ward of the Auckland Council.

Demographics

Conifer Grove West had a population of 4,710 at the 2018 New Zealand census, an increase of 93 people (2.0%) since the 2013 census, and an increase of 138 people (3.0%) since the 2006 census. There were 1,551 households, comprising 2,310 males and 2,400 females, giving a sex ratio of 0.96 males per female, with 960 people (20.4%) aged under 15 years, 942 (20.0%) aged 15 to 29, 2,160 (45.9%) aged 30 to 64, and 651 (13.8%) aged 65 or older.

Ethnicities were 63.4% European/Pākehā, 20.3% Māori, 13.3% Pacific peoples, 17.6% Asian, and 2.9% other ethnicities. People may identify with more than one ethnicity.

The percentage of people born overseas was 26.0, compared with 27.1% nationally.

Although some people chose not to answer the census's question about religious affiliation, 42.3% had no religion, 38.2% were Christian, 1.1% had Māori religious beliefs, 3.2% were Hindu, 1.4% were Muslim, 1.2% were Buddhist and 6.1% had other religions.

Of those at least 15 years old, 678 (18.1%) people had a bachelor's or higher degree, and 675 (18.0%) people had no formal qualifications. 744 people (19.8%) earned over $70,000 compared to 17.2% nationally. The employment status of those at least 15 was that 2,019 (53.8%) people were employed full-time, 456 (12.2%) were part-time, and 162 (4.3%) were unemployed.

Facilities

The older Conifer Grove precinct has a small shopping centre, however in the newly established Waiata Shores centre, it includes a Countdown supermarket and in the future will include more retail and office space. There are various parks/reserves such as Brylee Drive Reserve with two tennis courts and playground. This links to a board walk which goes around the waters/mangroves edge, which is enjoyed by many of the residents.  This walk has been extended to connect the boardwalk through to Walter Strevens Drive reserve.

Most of the streets are cul-de-sacs. Due to the suburbs design pattern, there was only one way in and out of the more recent area of Conifer Grove until 2021 when Brylee Drive was linked to Gosper Road of the adjacent Waiata Shores development. The Walter Strevens Drive roundabout also has a security camera which records vehicle movement in and out of the area.

Education

External links
Auckland Council
(Conifer Grove School Website)
Photographs of Conifer Grove held in Auckland Libraries' heritage collections.

References

Suburbs of Auckland
Populated places around the Manukau Harbour